Ma On Shan Park is a public park located at 12 On Chun Street in the town centre of Ma On Shan town in the Sha Tin District of Hong Kong's New Territories. It is situated next to the shopping centre of Ma On Shan Plaza. The natural scenery of Pat Sin Leng and Tolo Harbour can be viewed from the park. The park occupies  of land, and is managed by the Leisure and Cultural Services Department. The opening hours are from 6:30 am to 11:00 pm.

Gallery

Facilities nearby 
 Ma On Shan Public Library
 Ma On Shan Sports Centre
 Ma On Shan Swimming Pool
 Ma On Shan Promenade

See also
 List of urban public parks and gardens in Hong Kong
 Ma On Shan Iron Mine
 Sha Tin Park

External links

Web site of the Ma On Shan Park

Landmarks in Hong Kong
Tourist attractions in Hong Kong
Sha Tin District
Ma On Shan
Urban public parks and gardens in Hong Kong